The Essential Jefferson Airplane is a compilation of music from San Francisco rock band Jefferson Airplane spanning its entire career, excluding the brief reunion in 1989.

It follows their development from their beginnings in folk-rock through psychedelia to conventional rock genres.

Track listing

Disc one
"Blues from an Airplane" – 2:12 from Jefferson Airplane Takes Off (1966)
"It's No Secret" – 2:39 from Jefferson Airplane Takes Off
"Come Up the Years" – 2:32 from Jefferson Airplane Takes Off
"She Has Funny Cars" – 3:09 from Surrealistic Pillow (1967)
"Somebody to Love" – 2:56 from Surrealistic Pillow
"Comin' Back to Me" – 5:15 from Surrealistic Pillow
"Embryonic Journey" – 1:54 from Surrealistic Pillow
"White Rabbit" – 2:32 from Surrealistic Pillow
"The Ballad of You and Me and Pooneil" – 4:32 from After Bathing at Baxter's (1967)
"Martha" (mono single version) – 3:27 from After Bathing at Baxter's
"The Last Wall of the Castle" – 2:42 from After Bathing at Baxter's
"Watch Her Ride" – 3:17 from After Bathing at Baxter's
"Lather" – 2:57 from Crown of Creation (1968)
"Crown of Creation" – 2:54 from Crown of Creation
"Greasy Heart" – 3:27 from Crown of Creation
"Share a Little Joke" (mono single version) – 3:06 from Crown of Creation

Disc two
"3/5 of a Mile in 10 Seconds" (live) – 4:46 from Bless Its Pointed Little Head (1969)
"Plastic Fantastic Lover" (live) – 3:51 from Bless Its Pointed Little Head
"We Can Be Together" – 5:47 from Volunteers (1969)
"Good Shepherd" – 4:21 from Volunteers
"Wooden Ships" – 6:25 from Volunteers
"Eskimo Blue Day" – 6:33 from Volunteers
"Volunteers" – 2:04 from Volunteers
"Have You Seen the Saucers?" – 3:36 b-side to "Mexico" (1970)
"Mexico" (single version) – 2:09 non-album single
"When the Earth Moves Again" – 3:56 from Bark (1971)
"Pretty as You Feel" – 4:30 from Bark
"Third Week in the Chelsea" – 4:36 from Bark
"Long John Silver" – 4:26 from Long John Silver (1972)
"Twilight Double Leader" – 4:44 from Long John Silver
"Feel So Good" (live) – 11:23 from Thirty Seconds Over Winterland (1973)
"Milk Train" (live) – 3:28 from Thirty Seconds Over Winterland

References

Jefferson Airplane compilation albums
2005 greatest hits albums
RCA Records compilation albums